Patrick de Souza Conceicao (born July 19, 1983), or simply known as Patrick, is known as a right back who last played for Ceará.

Career
He has served in the Náutico and the Itumbiara on loan club Brasiliense.

Contract
 Brasiliense

References

External links
zerozerofootball.com

1983 births
Living people
Brazilian footballers
Clube Náutico Capibaribe players
Brasiliense Futebol Clube players
Ceará Sporting Club players

Association football defenders
Sportspeople from Rio de Janeiro (state)